Statistics of Swiss Super League in the 1923–24 season.

East

Table

Results

Central

Table

Results

West

Table

Results

Final

Table

Results 

|colspan="3" style="background-color:#D0D0D0" align=center|13 April 1924

|-
|colspan="3" style="background-color:#D0D0D0" align=center|4 May 1924

|-
|colspan="3" style="background-color:#D0D0D0" align=center|11 May 1924

FC Zürich won the championship.

Sources 
 Switzerland 1923-24 at RSSSF

Seasons in Swiss football
Swiss Football League seasons
1923–24 in Swiss football
Swiss